I Want My MTV may refer to:

 The original slogan of the television channel, MTV
 A line in the Dire Straits song, "Money for Nothing", which reiterates the MTV slogan
 I Want My MTV: The Uncensored Story of the Music Video Revolution, a 2011 book

American advertising slogans
1981 neologisms